Kurt Axelsson (10 November 1941 – 15 December 1984) was a Swedish professional footballer who played as a defender. He represented GAIS, Club Brugge, and A.S.V. Oostende K.M. during a career that spanned between 1964 and 1976. A full international between 1966 and 1971, he won 30 caps for the Sweden national team and represented his country at the 1970 FIFA World Cup.

Club career
Axelsson played for Rännbergs IK, IFK Sunne and IK Sleipner before making his top flight debut in the Allsvenskan in 1964, with GAIS. He was a valuable defender for the Gothenburg club and played 71 games for them. In 1967, he turned professional with Club Brugge KV in Belgium, where in 6 seasons, he played 153 games and scored 4 goals for the club. He then played for A.S.V. Oostende K.M. (1973–76) and was a player-coach for K.V. Kortrijk.

International career
Axelsson was capped 30 times between 1966 and 1971 for the Swedish national team and was a member of the team in the 1970 FIFA World Cup.

Personal life
Kurt Axelsson died in a car accident in 1984, aged 43

Honours 
Club Brugge

 Belgian First Division: 1972–73

 Belgian Cup: 1967–68, 1969–70

Individual

 Stor Grabb: 1967

 Swedish Football Hall of Fame: 2015

References

External links
clubbrugge.be clubbrugge.be Club Brugge website.

1941 births
1984 deaths
Swedish footballers
Swedish expatriate footballers
Sweden international footballers
1970 FIFA World Cup players
Club Brugge KV players
GAIS players
Belgian Pro League players
Expatriate footballers in Belgium
Swedish expatriate sportspeople in Belgium
Association football defenders